Carenum cavipenne is a species of ground beetle in the subfamily Scaritinae. It was described by Bates in 1874.

References

cavipenne
Beetles described in 1874